The NBC Television Network is an American television network made up of 12 owned-and-operated stations and nearly 223 affiliates. Stations are listed in alphabetical order by city of license.
 (**) – Indicates station was built and signed on by NBC.

Owned-and-operated stations

Affiliate stations

U.S. territories

Outside the U.S.

See also
List of NBC television affiliates (by U.S. state)
Lists of ABC television affiliates
Lists of CBS television affiliates

Notes

License ownership/operational agreements

Previous NBC affiliations

Satellites, semi-satellites and translators

References 

NBC